The ruddy cuckoo-dove (Macropygia emiliana) is a species of bird in the family Columbidae. It is a medium-sized, reddish brown cuckoo-dove, found in Brunei, Indonesia, and Malaysia. It is rated as a species of least concern on the International Union for Conservation of Nature Red List of Endangered Species.

Taxonomy 
The ruddy cuckoo-dove was first described by the French biologist and ornithologist Charles Lucien Jules Laurent Bonaparte in 1854. It was split from the slender-billed cuckoo-dove in 2003. It has two remaining sub-species:
 M. e. emiliana Bonaparte, 1854 - Java to western Lesser Sunda Islands
 M. e. megala Siebers, 1929 - Kangean Islands
Five former subspecies of the ruddy cuckoo-dove were reassigned by the IOU in 2016:
 M. e. cinnamomea Salvadori, 1892 - Enggano Island was split from the ruddy cuckoo-dove as the Enggano cuckoo-dove.
 M. e. borneensis Robinson & Kloss, 1921 - northern Borneo is now provisionally considered a subspecies of the Philippine cuckoo-dove(Macropygia tenuirostris borneensis).
 M. e. modiglianii Salvadori, 1887 - western Sumatran islands is now considered a subspecies of the Barusan cuckoo-dove.
 M. e. elassa Oberholser, 1912 - Mentawai Islands is now considered a subspecies of the Barusan cuckoo-dove.
 M. e. hypopercna Oberholser, 1912 - Simeulue Island is now considered a subspecies of the Barusan cuckoo-dove.

Description 
The ruddy cuckoo-dove is a medium-sized, reddish brown dove, that measures  in length. It has a uniformly ruddy head, and purplish brown, black-barred breast. The neck is pink iridescent. The tail is long and slender, and lacks any pale grey or white at the tip. The central tail coverts are uniformly ruddy, and lack any black barring. The juvenile resembles the female in appearance, but is more strongly barred.

Status and conservation 
Since 1988, the ruddy cuckoo-dove has been rated as a species of least concern on the IUCN Red List of Endangered Species. This is because it has a very large range—more than 20,000 km2 (7,700 mi2)—and because although its population has been declining, the rate of decrease is considered to be less over 30% decline over ten years or three generations. In addition, although its population numbers have not been determined, it is thought to be above 10,000, which is above the criterion to warrant a vulnerable rating. It is described to be rarely found, but is common on the Borneo Island and on islands off the south and west coasts Sumatra. It is thought to face a population decline due to habitat destruction.

References

External links
 
 

ruddy cuckoo-dove
Birds of Indonesia
ruddy cuckoo-dove
ruddy cuckoo-dove
Taxonomy articles created by Polbot